Zhang Yanghao (1270–1329), courtesy name Ximeng, was a Chinese writer from Shandong who lived during the Yuan dynasty and authored prose, poems, as well as songs. He is particularly well known for his Sanqu poetry. Among his works is one of the most frequently anthologized poems of the "meditation on the past" genre, a song poem titled "Meditation on the Past at Tong Pass" and set to the tune of "Sheep on Mountain Slope". Besides his work as a writer, Zhang Yanghao also held high government posts and served at one time as head of the Ministry of Rites. His tomb is in Shandong, to the north of the city center of Jinan.

Meditation on the Past at Tong Pass
The song poem "Meditation on the Past at Tong Pass" is Zhang Yanghao most well-known work.
It reads:

List of poems
 Untitled
 Untitled
 Shan Po Yang: Thinking of the Past at the Tong Pass

References

1270 births
1329 deaths
Yuan dynasty poets
Poets from Shandong
Writers from Jinan
Yuan dynasty essayists